Louis de Tousard (1749-1817) was a French artillerist who served in the American Continental Army under La Fayette, and later was given a US commission. Tousard wrote two very influential books: one was a proposal for a school for officers that became the blueprint for West Point, and the other was a manual for artillery officers that became standard in the young army.

Biography
He is the brother of Antoine Étienne de Tousard.

Educated at the Strasbourg school of artillery, Tousard served with the Continental Army between 1777-1778 and lost an arm due to wound received in the Battle of Rhode Island. He was decorated with the Order of Saint Louis on his return to France.

After being briefly imprisoned during the French Revolution in 1793 at Prison de l'Abbaye, he returned to the US in 1795 where he received a commission as a major in the 2nd U.S. Artillery Regiment in the Corps of Artillerists and Engineers. By 1800 he was a lieutenant colonel and Inspector of Artillery. As the Inspector, he supervised the construction of several forts in Eastern seaboard of the US, and the construction and testing of cannons.

His influence with George Washington was instrumental in the establishment of the U.S. Military Academy at West Point in 1802, initially to train engineers and artillerists, with a curriculum modeled after that of the École Polytechnique. After retiring from US service he served France in military and diplomatic capacities. In 1809 he published The American Arillerist's Companion, or Elements of Artillery, a book that became the basic manual for US artillerymen.

Influence on armory and manufacturing

His greatest influence was that he promoted Jean Baptiste Vaquette de Gribeauval's idea of interchangeable parts for guns. The War Department then set up the armories at Springfield and Harpers Ferry, which set out to perfect the idea. Despite the claims of Eli Whitney, who failed to deliver on his original 1798 contract until 1809 and who never achieved interchangeability, the American system of manufacturing was not perfected until inside contractor Captain John H. Hall realized it with the M1819 Hall rifle.

Historian David A. Hounshell said,

Other military contributions
Major de Tousard also designed Fort Adams and Fort Hamilton in Newport, Rhode Island.

References

Bibliography
 
 
 
 
 Sim Gérald, Louis Tousard (1749-1817). Un artilleur entre deux mondes, Paris, L'Harmattan, 2021.

External links
The Forgotten "Founder" of West Point — Military Affairs 24:177‑188 (1960)
Tousard, Louis de (1749-1817) to Henry Knox, 26 April 1802—The Gilder Lehrman Institute of American History
 Louis de Tousard Letter at The Historic New Orleans Collection

Further reading

French Army officers
French military personnel of the American Revolutionary War
French military writers
1749 births
1817 deaths
Order of Saint Louis recipients
French male non-fiction writers
Artillery person